The Beeson Divinity School of Samford University is an interdenominational evangelical divinity school located in Birmingham, Alabama, United States. The current dean is Douglas A. Sweeney.

Though located on the campus of a Baptist university, Beeson is interdenominational. The school offers the Master of Divinity degree and the Master of Arts in Theological Studies degree. It houses an Institute of Anglican Studies. In 2013 it began offering a Certificate of Anglican Studies and in 2021 a Certificate of Wesleyan Studies.

Founding 
Beeson Divinity was established on February 9, 1988. It is named for Ralph Waldo Beeson (1900–1990), who gave one of the largest donations (70 Million USD) in Samford history to create the first divinity school at a Baptist college in the US, and for his father, John Wesley Beeson. Ralph Beeson wanted the donation to remain anonymous, but relented to the naming of the school after his father at the suggestion of Samford's board of trustees.

Andrew Gerow Hodges Chapel 
The focal point of the divinity school is Andrew Gerow Hodges Chapel, dedicated in 1995 and named in honor of Andrew Gerow Hodges in 2002. Though an original design by Neil Davis of Davis Architects, it was inspired by Il Redentore in Venice designed by Andrea Palladio. The interior features three cycles of iconography. In the dome are sixteen prominent figures from Christian history representing a variety of theological traditions. It was inspired by a passage in chapter 12 of Hebrews. in the transept apses are ten painting depicting days or seasons of the Christian year, beginning with Advent and ending with Reformation Day. Both of these cycles were painted by the Romanian artist Petru Botezatu. The third cycle are six busts in cultured marble of 20th-century Christian martyrs from each of the six inhabited continents. These were made by Martin Dawes of Cherrylion Studios. These are in the crossing and aisles.

Deans 

 Timothy George, 1989–2019
 Douglas A. Sweeny, 2019–present

Notable faculty 
Gerald Bray, historical theology
Timothy George, historical theology, founding dean
Paul R. House, Old Testament, Hebrew

Conferences 
In the early twenty-first century, Beeson has hosted a number of theology conferences, including "The Will to Believe and the Need for Creed" (2009), "J.I. Packer and the Evangelical Future" (2006), and "God The Holy Trinity" (2004). Lectures from these conferences were published by Baker Academic Publishing as the Beeson Divinity Studies series.

References

External links 
 Beeson Divinity School website
 Guidebook for Hodges Chapel
 Video tour of Hodges Chapel

Educational institutions established in 1988
Seminaries and theological colleges in Alabama
Samford University
Universities and colleges in Birmingham, Alabama
University subdivisions in Alabama
1988 establishments in Alabama